Yoni is the second solo album to be released by Ginger, main driving force of rock band The Wildhearts. It was released on January 22, 2007 and features 12 tracks. It was produced by Tim Smith (of the Cardiacs) who had previously produced the debut album from SilverGinger 5, Black Leather Mojo, and Jason Edwards (Wolfsbane).

The album is dedicated to "the spirit, determination, strength & inspiration of Trace". This refers to "Trace da Space", an active and well-loved member of the Ginger/Wildhearts community, who died December 3, 2006.

Track listing 
"Black Windows" (5:35)
"When She Comes" (3:37)
"Holiday" (3:59)
"Smile In Denial" (6:14)
"Jake" (8:25)
"The Night I Was Born Again" (5:25)
"Why Can't You Just Be Normal All The Time" (3:24)
"Can't Drink You Pretty" (5:17)
 Contains part of the main "riff" from "In The Mood" (as popularised by Glenn Miller) as well as the chorus from "Boogie Woogie Bugle Boy" (as popularised by the Andrews Sisters).
"This Bed Is On Fire" (5:13)
"Save Me" (5:32)
"Wendy You're Killing Me" (3:33)
"Siberian Angel" (5:31)
 Lead vocal song by Vaden Todd Lewis, who is the singer/guitarist for Toadies.
"One Love,One Life,One Girl"*
"Inside Out"*
"Lil´Bit´O Gravy"*
 *Japanese bonus tracks
All songs written by Ginger.

Personnel

Main band
 Ginger - vocals, guitar, percussion
 "Random" Jon Poole - bass, vocals
 Denzel  - drums
 Jason Edwards - guitar, vocals
 Tim Smith - piano, Synthesizer, mellotron, tubular bells, vocals, keyboards, acoustic guitar, church organ, percussion,

Additional musicians
 Suzy Kirby - vocals
 Olga - vocals, lead guitar
 Chris Catalyst - vocals
 Tracie Hunter - backing vocals
 Phoebe White - backing vocals
 Ben Davies - piano
 Tom Evans - violin
 Sara Longe - violin
 Helen Goatly - viola
 Harry Escott - cello
 Bernie Torme - lead guitar
 Ralph Boss - baritone saxophone
 Neil Doherty - trumpet
 Tom Rushton - trumpet
 Nadiah Killick - alto saxophone
 Vaden Todd Lewis - vocals
 Sharron Fortnam - vocals
 Warner E Hodges - lead guitar

Notes and references 

Ginger (musician) albums
2007 albums

it:Yoni